Edward Lewis Young (1862 – March 24, 1940), was the Senior Director of First National Bank of Jersey City and was on the Morris Canal Commission.

References

1862 births
1940 deaths
Businesspeople from Jersey City, New Jersey
Morris Canal
American bankers